Rasmus Hatledal (1 February 1885 – 14 July 1963) was a Norwegian topographer and military officer. He was born in Stryn. He was appointed colonel and chief of the general staff in 1938. The post-World War II investigation committee, Undersøkelseskommisjonen av 1945, appreciated Hatledal's mobilizing efforts in the 1940 German invasion of Norway. He was decorated Commander of the Order of St. Olav in 1949, and was also Commander of the Swedish Order of the Sword.

References

1885 births
1963 deaths
People from Stryn
Norwegian Army personnel of World War II
Norwegian prisoners of war in World War II
World War II prisoners of war held by Germany
Commanders of the Order of the Sword